Trapped is a 2001 American action drama television film directed by Deran Sarafian, written by Michael Vickerman, and starring William McNamara, Parker Stevenson, Callum Keith Rennie, and Meat Loaf. It premiered on the USA Network on July 24, 2001.

Plot
A group of guests must escape a Las Vegas hotel that is on fire.

Cast
 William McNamara as C. Whitmore Evans
 Parker Stevenson as Oliver Sloan
 Callum Keith Rennie as Anthony Bellio 
 Suki Kaiser as Susan Bellio
 Stefanie von Pfetten as Rachel
 Natassia Malthe as Marisa
 Meat Loaf as Jim Hankins

Reception
David Nusair from Reel Film Reviews gave Trapped only one star out of five, he stated: "Trapped doesn't really work, especially since we know exactly how these folks are going to get out of the burning building (c'mon, would it even be possible not to realize that Meat Loaf's ride is going to work its way back into the plot?) and the characters are straight out of a how-to-create-a-disaster-movie handbook. And for a flick with this many characters, remarkably few of them wind up charred corpses." Jules Faber from DVD.net gave the film 7 out of 10 stars, concluding: "Trapped is perhaps one of this new breed of film with some decent performances and clever, well-executed special effects. While a far cry from Oscar-winning portrayals, this is nonetheless a surprisingly good production, regardless of the rather tacked on ‘arsonist’ subplot."

References

External links
 
 

2001 films
2001 action drama films
2000s American films
2000s disaster films
2000s English-language films
Action television films
American action drama films
American disaster films
American drama television films
Disaster television films
Films about high-rise fires
Films directed by Deran Sarafian
Films set in hotels
Films set in the Las Vegas Valley
USA Network original films